Jus-Rol is a manufacturer of frozen pastry and related products, such as vol-au-vents. The company is owned by General Mills.

The company began in 1954 in Coldstream, Scotland, when local baker, Mr Tom Forsythe, started selling "Just Roll" puff pastry to his customers. Jus-Rol used to have more than one factory – the other was located in Amble but was sold in the mid-to-late 1990s. In 1975 the business was sold to the food giant Fitch Lovell, before being sold off by Booker Group (the new owners of Fitch Lovell) in 1990 to Grand Metropolitan.

In early 2007, the parent company of Jus-Rol, General Mills, acquired the Northamptonshire frozen pastry and pork pie company Saxby Bros Ltd, in a takeover bid.  All frozen pastry production was transferred from the Wellingborough Saxby's site to Berwick-upon-Tweed in 2008, terminating the Saxby brand.  In 2016 the Berwick site closed as General Mills moved production outside the UK.

British Pie Week
In 2007, Jus-Rol launched an annual celebration British Pie Week on 4 March.

External links

Bakeries of the United Kingdom
General Mills brands